Stacked is the debut album by American rapper Kash Doll. It was released on October 18, 2019, by Republic. It features the singles "Ice Me Out" (later remixed by 2 Chainz), "Kitten", "Ready Set" and "Mobb'n". The album features guest appearances from Big Sean, Lil Wayne, Summer Walker, Teyana Taylor, Trey Songz and LouGotCash. The album sold approximately 8,600 units in its first week of release, in the US.

The album reached number 14 on Billboard's "Rap Album Sales" chart. It debuted at number 76 on the US Billboard 200.

Track listing
Adapted from Apple Music.

Charts

References

2019 debut albums